Alexander Viktorovich Karzanov (born 1947) is a Russian mathematician known for his work in combinatorial optimization. He is the inventor of preflow-push based algorithms for the maximum flow problem, and the co-inventor of the Hopcroft–Karp–Karzanov algorithm for maximum matching in bipartite graphs. He is a chief researcher at the Federal Research Center "Computer Science and Control" (Institute for System Analysis) of the Russian Academy of Sciences.

Karzanov was educated at Moscow State University, completing his doctorate there in 1971. With Georgy Adelson-Velsky and Yefim Dinitz
he is the co-author of the book Потоковые алгоритмы [Flow algorithms] (Moscow: Nauka, 1975). He was an invited speaker at the 1990 International Congress of Mathematicians.

References

External links
Personal home page

1947 births
Living people
Russian mathematicians
Moscow State University alumni